Prospidium chloride (prospidine) is a drug with cytostatic (alkylating) and anti-inflammatory properties.  It has been studied for the treatment of rheumatoid arthritis.

Chemically, it is a spiro compound.

References

External links
 Prospidium Chloride, NCI Thesaurus, National Cancer Institute

Quaternary ammonium compounds
Piperazines
Chlorides
Organochlorides
Secondary alcohols
Spiro compounds
Drugs in the Soviet Union